Justice Chavez may refer to:

David Chávez, associate justice of the New Mexico Supreme Court
Edward L. Chávez, associate justice and chief justice of the New Mexico Supreme Court